Tobias Thune Jacobsen (born 10 July 1994) is a Danish curler from Gentofte municipality.

At the national level, he is a two-time Danish men's champion curler (2017, 2020) and a four-time Danish junior champion curler (2012, 2013, 2015, 2016) and a four-time Danish individual (figur) champion (2014, 2015, 2017, 2018).

Teams

Men's

Mixed

Mixed doubles

Personal life 
Thune holds a Bachelor of Education and a M.Sc. in Humanities and Social Sports Sciences from the University of Copenhagen. Thune has written a scientific article on sports policy and has actively participated in the public debate with a number of articles. Thune is a board member of the governing body for the sport of curling in Denmark, also he is the chairman of the Danish players association.

Currently Thune is studying a diploma in leadership and working as a development consultant for the Danish Parachute Association.

References

External links

 
 

Living people
1994 births
Danish male curlers
Danish curling champions
Place of birth missing (living people)
People from Hvidovre Municipality
Curlers at the 2022 Winter Olympics
University of Copenhagen alumni
Olympic curlers of Denmark
Sportspeople from the Capital Region of Denmark
21st-century Danish people